is a private university at Nisshin, Aichi, Japan. The predecessor of the school was founded in 1945, and it was chartered as a university in 2002.

External links
 Official website 

Educational institutions established in 1945
Private universities and colleges in Japan
Universities and colleges in Aichi Prefecture
1945 establishments in Japan
Nisshin, Aichi